"Dancing with Mr. D." is the opening track of the English rock and roll band the Rolling Stones' 1973 album Goats Head Soup.

Background
Written by Mick Jagger and Keith Richards, "Dancing with Mr. D." is a brooding rocker in line with much of the Stones' funk inspired recordings from the Goats Head Soup era. The song opens with a riff by Richards prominently repeated throughout the song. Jagger's lyrics allude to either dalliance with a succubus or Death;

Jagger's lyrics are somewhat more self reflective than the devil imagery he adopted since "Sympathy for the Devil". The chorus contrasts with the lyrics with backing vocals by the group and its steady rhythm.

The song would best serve as an introduction to the Stones' studio-based sound of the mid-1970s after the sprawling epic Exile on Main St. Recording began at Dynamic Sounds studio in Kingston, Jamaica, and would continue at Village Recorders in Los Angeles and Island Recording Studios in London. Billy Preston, who had contributed on a few songs with the Stones in the past, would become a heavy collaborator over the next few albums and here performs clavinet. Nicky Hopkins highlights with pianos throughout while Rebop Kwaku Baah and Pascal perform percussion. Mick Taylor performs electric slide guitar as well as bass while Charlie Watts performs drums.

Critical reception
Tom Maginnis of Allmusic said of the song that it "can only be viewed as mediocre by the Stones' impossibly high standards by this point." Bud Scoppa of Rolling Stone was more critical, calling the song "hopelessly silly" as well as "the weakest opener ever so positioned on one of their albums, and they’ve never performed with less conviction."

Personnel
Mick Jagger: vocals, background vocals
Keith Richards: electric guitar, background vocals
Mick Taylor: electric guitar, bass
Charlie Watts: drums
Nicky Hopkins: piano
Anthony Kwaku Baah, Nicholas Pascal Raicevic: percussion

Live performances
"Dancing with Mr. D." has been performed by the Stones on their 1973 tour of Europe and on five shows of their 2017 No Filter Tour. It served as the B-side to album mate "Doo Doo Doo Doo Doo (Heartbreaker)".
A live version is available on the bonus disc of the "HONK" album. This version was recorded at the GelreDome in Arnhem on October 15, 2017.

References

External links
Complete Official Lyrics

1973 songs
The Rolling Stones songs
Songs written by Jagger–Richards
Song recordings produced by Jimmy Miller
Music videos directed by Michael Lindsay-Hogg